Demetrius III Aniketos (epithet means "the Invincible") is an Indo-Greek king who reigned in the area of Gandhara and Punjab.

Controversy about time of reign
The coins of Demetrius III are few and rather crude. He copies some of his imagery from the renowned Bactrian king Demetrius I (c. 200–180 BCE). The two namesakes share the war-like epithet "The Invincible" and wear elephant-crowns, the symbol that Alexander the Great used to celebrate his conquest of the Indus Valley.

The historical sources of the Indo-Greek kingdom are very few, and the separation of kings with the same name is not an easy process. Numismatician Osmund Bopearachchi identifies three kings named Demetrius, placing the third around 100 BCE due to mintmarks and style of the coins (see discussion under Demetrius II). R C Senior agrees with this reconstruction, even though their dates are somewhat different: according to Bopearachchi he ruled around 100 BCE, whereas R. C. Senior places him circa 70 BCE, in both cases as successor of Heliokles II.

However, Demetrius III is the only Demetrius to strike bilingual Greek/Indian (Kharoshti) coins, and is therefore a likely candidate to be identified with the "Demetrius, king of the Indians" mentioned by Roman historian Justin. This Demetrius is said to have fought with the Bactrian king Eucratides (c. 170–145 BCE) during the latter part of Eucratides' rule. Bopearachchi nevertheless identifies Justin's Demetrius with the king Demetrius II even though he only struck Greek coins and reigned c. 175–170 BCE, even before Eucratides. In addition, Bopearachchi's early dating of Demetrius II has been challenged (see discussion under Demetrius II).

Yet other authors have identified Justin's Demetrius with Demetrius I of Bactria, ignoring both Bopearachchi's chronology as well as modifying Justin's text.

Earlier authors such as Tarn and Narain thought that the Demetrius who struck the coins now identified with Demetrius III was the king who fought Eucratides, and saw him as a son of Demetrius I.

The absence of absolute proofs of dating Demetrius III (such as counter-marked coins), and the remaining problems of all current reconstructions, means the problem is not definitely solved, and the alternative chronology would be to place Demetrius III around 150 BCE in compliance with Tarn's and Narain's ideas about his identity as a Euthydemid prince who fought against Eucratides.

Possible dynastic context

If he ruled around 150 BCE, he was very likely a surviving Euthydemid prince like Tarn and Narain assumed, and due to his name this would make sense. The symbols of his coin connect him with several Euthydemid kings: the kausia hat on one of his portrait with Antimachus I, the elephant-crown and the title Aniketos as mentioned with Demetrius I, and the standing Zeus on his silver reverses with Agathocles.

Coins of Demetrius III
The actual coins of Demetrius III are very few and struck with a single, unique monogram. This suggests a short and insignificant reign. On his silver, Demetrius III appears in the kausia hat (on the unique known tetradrachm) or diademed, with a reverse of Zeus holding thunderbolt. His bronzes feature a king in elephant's crown, either Demetrius III or Demetrius I, with thunderbolt on the reverse.

See also
 Indo-Greek Kingdom
 Greco-Buddhism
 Indo-Scythians

Notes

Indo-Greek kings
1st-century BC rulers in Asia
2nd-century BC rulers in Asia
Euthydemid dynasty